Liushi is a town of Hengnan County, Hunan, China. , it has two residential communities and 20 villages under its administration.

References

Towns of Hunan
Hengnan County